Xia Douyin (1885–1951) was a Republic of China National Revolutionary Army general. He was born in Macheng, Hubei. Originally a member of the Qing Dynasty New Army, he participated in the Xinhai Revolution of 1911. In 1917, he joined the Constitutional Protection Movement and opposed local warlord Wang Zhanyuan. Defeated by Wang's forces, he fled to Changsha and enlisted the help of allies in Hunan against Wang. After suffering another defeat in 1919, he fled to the border region of Hunan and Jiangxi Provinces. In 1926, he was brought by Tang Shengzhi into the National Revolutionary Army and participated in the Northern Expedition as a divisional commander. On May 17, 1927, Xia led Kuomintang forces loyal to Chiang Kai-shek from Yichang against the forces of Ye Ting in Wuhan. Chiang promoted Xia to army commander. Xia fought against the Chinese Workers' and Peasants' Red Army and in the Central Plains War of 1930. In 1932, Xia was promoted to full general and made governor of Hubei, although Zhang Qun actually acted in his place. During the Second Sino-Japanese War, Xia fled to Chengdu after Hubei was occupied by the invading Imperial Japanese Army. In 1945, he retired from the military. Although he attempted to welcome the Communist Party of China takeover of the mainland, the communists rebuffed him and he fled to Hong Kong, where he died.

National Revolutionary Army generals from Hubei
People from Huanggang
1885 births
1951 deaths
Chinese Civil War refugees
Members of the 1st Legislative Yuan